Priede is a Latvian surname, meaning pine in Latvian.

People
 Gunārs Priede (1928–2000), Latvian playwright, engineer and architect
 Rubén Priede (born 1966), Argentine cyclist
 Liene Priede (born 1990), Latvian basketball player

Latvian-language surnames